Mao Tse Toung Boulevard​  also called Street 245 or Issarak Street is a central boulevard of Phnom Penh connected Norodom Boulevard at Chamkar Mon Traffic Light at East and Ends at 10 Makara Flyover, Russian Federation Boulevard. It is named in honour of Mao Zedong, a former Chairman of the Communist Party of China.

References

Roads in Cambodia
Transport in Phnom Penh
Boulevards